The Bugatti Chiron is a mid-engine two-seater sports car designed and developed in Germany by Bugatti Engineering GmbH and manufactured in Molsheim, France, by French automobile manufacturer Bugatti Automobiles S.A.S. The successor to the Bugatti Veyron, the Chiron was first shown at the Geneva Motor Show on 1 March 2016. The car's design was initially previewed with the Bugatti Vision Gran Turismo concept car unveiled at the 2015 Frankfurt Auto Show.

The car is named after the Monégasque driver Louis Chiron. The car shares the name with the 1999 Bugatti 18/3 Chiron concept car.



Specifications and performance 

The main carry over component from the Veyron is the  quad-turbocharged W16 engine, though it is heavily updated.
The engine in the most powerful variant of its predecessor, the Veyron Super Sport generates  less than the new Chiron, while the engine in the original Veyron generates  less power.

Like its predecessor, the Veyron, the Chiron utilises a carbon fibre body structure, independent suspension and a Haldex All-wheel drive system. The carbon fibre body has a stiffness of 50,000 Nm per degree.

In a world-record-setting test at the time in 2017, the Chiron reached  in 32.6 seconds, after which it needed 9.4 seconds to brake to standstill.

Independent testing by an owner has indicated that the Chiron can easily attain its limited top speed.

Sales 
The first 200 cars were sold before the first was delivered. The base price is €2,400,000 and buyers were required to place a €200,000 deposit before their purchase. The first three Chiron were delivered to their owners in Europe and the Middle East in March 2017. In January 2022, every Chiron had been sold, although , not all have been manufactured.

Variants

Chiron Sport (2018) 

At the 2018 Geneva Motor Show, Bugatti unveiled the track focused version of the Chiron, named the Chiron Sport. Mechanically the car is identical to the regular version, generating  from a quad-turbocharged W16 engine but is  lighter due to the extensive use of carbon fibre and has a stiffer suspension in order to increase the cornering ability of the car while maintaining its grand touring characteristics. The steering of the car has also received modifications and a torque vectoring system to control the power sent to each wheel of the car for improved handling in tight corners has been added. Aerodynamic improvements and light weight have been given special consideration in order to keep the car competitive on the race track. The Chiron Sport became available in late 2018 for an additional  on the standard Chiron.

In April 2022, Bugatti issued a factory recall for a 2018 Chiron, built 16 November 2017, due to a loose front frame support screw.

Chiron Sport 110 Ans Bugatti (2019) 

Introduced in February 2019, the 110 Ans Bugatti is a limited edition variant of the Chiron Sport developed to celebrate 110 years of Bugatti. The car features carbon fibre bodywork finished in matte Steel Blue exterior colour. The body is also accented with Steel Blue bare carbon fibre. The exhaust system of the car is finished in matte black colour.

The colours of the French flag are present on the wing mirrors, fuel filler cap and on the underside of the rear wing. The brake calipers are finished in blue colour.

The interior of the car is upholstered in blue Alcantara and also has the colours of the French flag present on the headrests of the seats, on the back of the seats and on top of the steering wheel. Production will be limited to 20 units.

Chiron Super Sport 300+ (2019) 

On 8 September 2019, Bugatti presented a limited production high performance variant of the Chiron called the Chiron Super Sport 300+ to owners taking part in the company's 110th-anniversary tour in Europe. The variant is limited to 30 examples at a net unit price of 3.5 million euros. The car is closely resembles the prototype performing the top speed record run. Changes from the standard Chiron include a more powerful engine, increased top speed, and a characteristic paint scheme featuring a lacquer-coated carbon fibre body with orange stripes, echoing the aesthetics of the company's previous top speed record-breaking cars, the Veyron Super Sport World Record Edition and the Veyron Grand Sport Vitesse World Record Car.

The car is powered by a  quad-turbocharged W16 engine shared with the Bugatti Centodieci, nicknamed "Thor".

The Super Sport 300+ will also be equipped with a top speed limiter, akin to the one found in the standard Chiron. Bugatti will also prepare the cars of owners who want to take the car to its full potential at the Ehra-Lessien test track.

The first eight were delivered in September 2021. 

Bugatti delivered the final Chiron Super Sport 300+ on 21 July 2022.

Chiron Noire (2020)  

Bugatti announced a special-edition, the Chiron Noire, celebrating the 1936 Bugatti Type 57SC Coupé Aero No. 57453 (also known as "La Voiture Noire") following the 2019 one-off homage and namesake "La Voiture Noire". The special edition comes in two versions, the Noire Élégance (black exposed carbon body) and the Noire Sportive (black exposed carbon body covered with a matte black finish). Only 20 will be made. The Noire starts at around $3.3 million, and deliveries are expected to begin in mid-2020.

Chiron Pur Sport (2020) 

On 3 March 2020, Bugatti introduced the Chiron Pur Sport, a handling-focused model which will be limited to 60 units. The tachometer has an additional 200 rpm, increasing the redline to 6,900 rpm. 80 percent of the transmission has been revised for a 15 percent closer gear-ratio spread benefiting the power band. The Pur Sport is  lighter than the standard Chiron due to a lightweight 3D printed titanium exhaust, a fixed rear spoiler and extensive use of Alcantara, anodised aluminium and titanium on the interior. The wheels have special spokes called "aero blades" which are designed to channel turbulent air near the wheel down the side of the vehicle to the rear diffuser. The tyres are Michelin Sport Cup 2R increasing lateral grip by 10 percent, and were co-developed with Michelin. To improve handling, the springs were made 65 percent stiffer at the front and 33 percent at the rear, aided by revised damper tuning and wheel camber along with additional front and rear carbon-fibre anti-roll bars and a new Sport+ drive mode. Production of the Pur Sport is expected to start in late 2020. The first car was delivered to the owner in United States in January 2021. The 30th Chiron Pur Sport has been delivered to its owner on 1 December 2022, marking the production reaches the halfway point.

Chiron Sport Les Légendes du Ciel (2020) 

Introduced in November 2020, the "Les Légendes du Ciel" Chiron is a limited edition version of the Chiron Sport developed to celebrate Bugatti's racing drivers that flew in the French Air Force.

The car features a new grill, a French flag behind the front wheels, a matte grey ("Gris Serpent") exterior colour with a gloss white stripe in the centre.
The interior is upholstered in tan leather and turned aluminium.

Production will be limited to 20 units and expected to start in late 2020 at €2.88 million each.

Chiron Super Sport (2021) 

On 8 June 2021, Bugatti introduced the standard version of the 300+ world record car. Unlike the 300+, it does not come with interior stiffening and has more leather in the interior like a typical Bugatti Chiron. More visual differences include special redesigned wheels and a paint finish instead of the bare carbon fibre seen in the 300+. Unlike the 300+, the limiter cannot be disabled by Bugatti in the Super Sport for prepared runs. Customer delivery will start in early 2022 at a net unit price of  each. The first car was delivered in April 2022. About 70–80 will be built.

Chiron Pur Sport Grand Prix (2021) 

The Chiron Pur Sport Grand Prix was announced in December 2021. It is the first project of Bugatti’s new ‘Sur Mesure’ (meaning tailored in French) customization program, so it is a one-off car. In 1931, Louis Chiron won the French Grand Prix at Montlhéry in his Type 51 – an enhanced version of  the legendary Type 35 – together with Achille Varzi.  The number 32 was displayed in bold letters on their racing car and is now hand painted on the doors of the Chiron Pur Sport 'Grand Prix'. "EB" logo patterns are also hand painted in red on the front and rear fenders. Inside, the car features black leather and red Alcantara, embroidered  "EB" pattern on the door panels and black anodized aluminum trim panels with silver logos.

Chiron Profilée (2022) 

The Chiron Profilée is a one-off special introduced in December 2022. It is based on the Chiron Pur Sport, but features a new aerodynamic profile characterized by wider air dams and a bigger grille up front, a redesigned front splitter, and a relatively small rear wing with a hollow middle section. Bugatti also made changes to the steering and suspension systems, and it gave the seven-speed, dual-clutch automatic transmission 15% shorter gear ratios. It's finished in silver (Argent Atlantique) and the bottom part of the car features bare carbon fiber that's tinted in blue (Bleu Royal Carbon). It is the first Chiron fitted with woven leather on the dashboard, the center console and the door panels.

Bugatti had planned to build 30 units, but as the production of its pre-series vehicle started, all 500 Chiron slots were already assigned. The project was cancelled and the car never entered production thus only one example was built and it is fully street-legal in European markets. At the time of its sale, it was believed to be the last street-legal W16-powered car Bugatti sold, as the Chiron and the Mistral were already sold-out.

Other Bugatti based on the Chiron

La Voiture Noire (2019) 

The La Voiture Noire is a one-off special introduced at the 2019 Geneva Motor Show. Based on the Chiron, the design of the car harkens back to the Type 57 SC Atlantic and is a celebration of the company's distinctive design history. The car has a hand-built body made from carbon fibre designed by Bugatti designer Etienne Salomé which has an elongated nose (similar to that on the Divo) and an elongated rear section. Other notable features include unique wing mirrors, LED taillight strip, and wheels. Unlike the original, the car has a mid-engine layout.

A trim piece running from the front of the car to the rear spoiler recalls the dorsal fin present on the Type 57 SC. The car features a floating windscreen and has masked A-pillars. The La Voiture Noire's shares large design similarities from the Bugatti Rembrandt, a cancelled front-engine grand tourer powered by the Chiron's W16 engine.

The La Voiture Noire will be powered by the same 8.0-litre quad-turbocharged W16 engine from the Chiron having the same power output figures but the 7-speed dual-clutch gearbox and the all-wheel-drive system are heavily revised in order to allow for a more relaxed driving experience. Softer dampers and a revised chassis contribute to the factor. The car features six exhaust pipes recalling the innovative design of the past.

Performance figures remain unknown but the company states that the car is likely to have a lower top speed and acceleration times as compared to the Chiron due to its Grand Touring nature. The car was sold for a price of $18.68 million, making it one of the most expensive cars built to date.

A statement made later by the company confirmed that the car on display was a concept car and that the final product would take two and a half years more to complete. The show car had electric motors instead of an engine for easy maneuverability. Differing from the show car, the real La Voiture Noire has a Cognac (Brown) Leather Interior and a fully-functioning drivetrain with its W16 engine sourced from the Chiron.

According to reports from tabloid newspapers, La Voiture Noire was registered in Zurich, Switzerland in December 2021. La Voiture Noire is owned by a member of the family of the late Ferdinand Piëch, the man for whom the car was initially commissioned (though he passed away before receiving it).

La Voiture Noire has been subject to significant misinformation surrounding its ownership. A number of newspapers, tabloids, and online blogs created and spread false claims that Portuguese footballer Cristiano Ronaldo was the owner of the vehicle. This rumour, which is believed to have originated with a report from Spanish sports newspaper Marca was denied by a spokesperson for Ronaldo. Despite this blatantly false claim, the belief that Ronaldo owns La Voiture Noire remains pervasive online.

Records

Acceleration and braking record

The car was driven by Colombian racing driver Juan Pablo Montoya.

Bugatti also added an extra livery to the Chiron on display to confirm that it was the same car that broke the  record.

The record has since been broken by the Koenigsegg Regera and other vehicles.

Top speed achievement

The speed was verified by the TÜV, Germany's Technical Inspection Association.

The car was developed under Bugatti head exterior designer Frank Heyl in collaboration with Italian automobile engineering firm Dallara and tyre manufacturer Michelin over the course of six months. To further reduce drag and aid aerodynamics, the electronically controlled rear wing was removed and was replaced with a long tail incorporating a rear wing with a short cross-section. A full roll cage was added for safety reasons, and the passenger seat was removed to make way for data recording equipment used to validate the record run. The car incorporates an exhaust system first introduced on the Bugatti Centodieci in order to further reduce aerodynamic drag. Mechanically, the engine was modified to generate  of power output with no changes to the gearbox and all-wheel-drive system.

Production

Marketing
The Chiron was recreated in Lego as 2018's annual Technic sports car. It was released on 1 June 2018 as a 1:8 scale model with 3,600 individual parts.

On 30 August 2018, Lego unveiled a working full-sized model of the Chiron. It was constructed almost entirely with Lego Technic elements (339 unique types, over 1,000,000 pieces in total) with exceptions for the Bugatti badge, the wheels, a steel frame, a steel roll cage, a steel drive chain and the seat belts. The car was test driven by Andy Wallace, Bugatti's official test driver, at Volkswagen's Ehra-Lessien test track.

See also
 Bugatti Vision Gran Turismo
 Bugatti Divo
 Bugatti Centodieci
 List of production cars by power output

References

External links 
 
 

Chiron
Cars introduced in 2016
Rear mid-engine, all-wheel-drive vehicles
Grand tourers
Coupés
Flagship vehicles